Brimfield State Forest is a Massachusetts state forest located in and around the town of Brimfield in Hampden County, Massachusetts.  The forest includes Dean Pond Recreation Area, a popular spot for fishing, picnicking and swimming. The park is managed by the Department of Conservation and Recreation.

Activities and amenities
Trails: Over  of roads and trails are used for hiking, horseback riding, mountain biking, and cross-country skiing.
Day-use area: Dean Pond Recreation Area offers a  swimming beach, picnic grounds, and fully accessible restrooms.
The forest also offers fishing and restricted hunting.

In the news
Following a tornado in 2011, the Dean Pond Recreation Area was closed for two years. It reopened in 2013.

References

External links
Brimfield State Forest Department of Conservation and Recreation
Brimfield State Forest Trail Map Department of Conservation and Recreation

Massachusetts state forests
Parks in Hampden County, Massachusetts
Brimfield, Massachusetts